Heinz-Josef "Jupp" Koitka (born 12 February 1952 is a former German football player.

He started his career 1971 at SG Wattenscheid 09. Via Frankfurt he moved for the 1979–80 campaign to 2. Bundesliga Nord side Rot-Weiß Lüdenscheid and left them after a season for Hamburger SV. In total he appeared in 142 Bundesliga matches, most of them for Eintracht Frankfurt (91).

His greatest success was the German championship with Hamburger SV in 1982 after being runner-up in the previous season. In 1982, he reached the UEFA Cup final, as a backup to Uli Stein.

In 1990 Koitka finished his career at HSV. After his active career he returned to his roots and became coach and goalkeeping coach at SG Wattenscheid 09. His son Kai Koitka played for the 09ers from 2003 until 2006 as well.

Heinz-Josef Koitka was engaged at DFB responsible for the Under 21 goalkeepers and match observer.

References

External links
 Jupp Koitka at eintracht-archiv.de 
 

1952 births
Living people
German footballers
Germany B international footballers
SG Wattenscheid 09 players
Eintracht Frankfurt players
Hamburger SV players
Alemannia Aachen players
Bundesliga players
2. Bundesliga players
Association football goalkeepers
West German footballers
Sportspeople from Bochum
Footballers from North Rhine-Westphalia
Association football goalkeeping coaches